The girls' 50 metre breaststroke event at the 2018 Summer Youth Olympics took place on 7 and 8 October at the Natatorium in Buenos Aires, Argentina.

Results

Heats
The heats were started on 7 October at 10:24.

Semifinals

The semifinals were started on 7 October at 18:07.

Final
The final was held on 8 October at 18:14.

References

Swimming at the 2018 Summer Youth Olympics